Rubén Salvador Pérez del Mármol (born 26 April 1989) is a Spanish professional footballer who plays for Super League Greece club Panathinaikos as a defensive midfielder.

Club career

Atlético Madrid
Pérez was born in Écija, Andalusia. Having arrived at Atlético Madrid's youth system at age 13, he made his debut for the first team on 15 May 2010 in a 0–3 home loss against Getafe CF, replacing another youth product, the injured Borja.

On 25 July 2010, as part of the transfer of Filipe Luís to the Colchoneros, Pérez was loaned to fellow La Liga club Deportivo de La Coruña for two seasons, He made his debut for the Galicians on 12 September, playing 80 minutes in the 0–0 draw at Sevilla FC.

In August 2011, after [[2010–11 La Liga|''Depors relegation]], Pérez returned to the top division and joined Getafe, with Borja Fernández heading in the opposite direction. He featured in only ten games for the Madrid side during the entire campaign, in all competitions.

In June 2012, Pérez was loaned to Real Betis in a season-long loan. Still owned by Atlético he represented, in the following years, Elche CF, Serie A's Torino F.C. and Granada CF; he signed a permanent, four-year deal with the latter on 8 August 2015.

Leganés
On 9 August 2016, Pérez was loaned to fellow top-tier club CD Leganés in a season-long deal. The following 29 June, his loan was extended for a further year. 

Pérez returned to Leganés on a four-year contract after cutting ties with Granada. He scored once from 26 appearances in 2019–20, but his team returned to the Segunda División after a four-year stay. 

Panathinaikos
On 14 July 2021, Panathinaikos F.C. signed Pérez on a two-year contract for an undisclosed fee.

Career statistics

HonoursPanathinaikosGreek Cup: 2021–22Spain U21'''
UEFA European Under-21 Championship: 2011

References

External links

1989 births
Living people
People from Écija
Sportspeople from the Province of Seville
Spanish footballers
Footballers from Andalusia
Association football midfielders
La Liga players
Segunda División players
Segunda División B players
Atlético Madrid B players
Atlético Madrid footballers
Deportivo de La Coruña players
Getafe CF footballers
Real Betis players
Elche CF players
Granada CF footballers
CD Leganés players
Serie A players
Torino F.C. players
Super League Greece players
Panathinaikos F.C. players
Spain under-21 international footballers
Spanish expatriate footballers
Expatriate footballers in Italy
Expatriate footballers in Greece
Spanish expatriate sportspeople in Italy
Spanish expatriate sportspeople in Greece